Panopoda rigida is a species of moth in the family Erebidae.

The MONA or Hodges number for Panopoda rigida is 8590.

References

Further reading

 
 
 

Eulepidotinae
Articles created by Qbugbot
Moths described in 1903